Subhash K. Jha is an Indian journalist and film critic. Based in Patna, Bihar, he is currently film critic with The Times of India, Firstpost, Deccan Chronicle and DNA News, Rediff.com, Free Press Journal, besides TV channels Zee News and News18 India. In the 1980s, he was also book reviewer with The Illustrated Weekly of India, a publication of The Times Group. Other past media outlets he wrote for include entertainment portal Bollywood Hungama.

Jha is one of the leading and well-known film critics in India. His book, The Essential Guide To Bollywood, was positively reviewed, with Rachna Singh of The Tribune writing, "The gloss and starry glitter notwithstanding, Jha’s book is a wonderful collection of 200 films spanning almost seven decades of Indian cinema.". IndiaFM wrote, "Jha, a very recognized figure in the world of film journalism ends up giving up his personal favorite list of Bollywood films."

Bibliography

References

External links
 

Indian film critics
Indian male journalists
Living people
1959 births
Writers from Patna
The Times of India journalists